The Diary of Anne Frank is 1987 BBC serial drama. It was based on The Diary of a Young Girl by Anne Frank, and it starred Elizabeth Bell, Janet Amsbury, Katharine Schlesinger and Emrys James.

Cast

Katharine Schlesinger as Anne Frank
Emrys James as Otto Frank
Elizabeth Bell as Edith Frank
Emma Harbour as Margot Frank
Christopher Benjamin as Mr van Daan
Steven Mackintosh as Peter van Daan
Susan Tracy as Petronella van Daan
David Swift as Albert Dussel
Janet Amsbury as Miep Gies
Nigel Anthony as Mr Kraler

See also
List of films about Anne Frank
List of Holocaust films

References

External links

1987 British television series debuts
1987 British television series endings
1980s British drama television series
1980s British television miniseries
BBC television dramas
English-language television shows
Television series set in the 1940s
Films about Anne Frank
Holocaust films
Works based on diaries
BBC television miniseries